Iron Monkey can refer to:

Iron Monkey (1977 film)
Iron Monkey (1993 film)
Iron Monkey (band)